The Battle of Bash Abaran ( Bash Abarani chakatamart) was a battle of Caucasus Campaign of World War I that took place in the vicinity of Bash Abaran, in 1918. The Armenian victories at Bash Abaran, Sardarabad and Karakilisa, halted the Ottoman invasion of Eastern Armenia and were instrumental in allowing the formation of the short-lived First Republic of Armenia.

The Turkish forces attacked on 21 May, driving towards Yerevan. They were opposed by Armenian forces under the command of Drastamat Kanayan. One prong of the three-pronged Ottoman attack, consisting of the 3rd Regiment of the 11th Caucasian Division, moved down from Hamamlu. They met an Armenian force of about 1000 riflemen under the command of Movses Silikyan at the defile of Bash Abaran, about a three-hour march from Yerevan. After three days of fierce fighting the Armenians launched a counter-attack against the Turks on 25 May. The Turkish forces then retreated north back to Hamamlu on 29 May.

References 

Abaran
Abaran
Abaran
1918 in Armenia
1918 in the Ottoman Empire
Conflicts in 1918
May 1918 events